Pine River may refer to any of the following rivers in the U.S. state of Michigan:

 Pine River (Alcona County, Michigan).
 Pine River (Arenac County, Michigan).
 Pine River (Charlevoix County, Michigan) is a short waterway, which along with Round Lake, connects Lake Charlevoix with Lake Michigan at Charlevoix.
The South Branch Pine River joins the main stream at  Another tributary, Miller Creek, is also sometimes known as Pine River or the West Branch Pine River.
Another tributary, Hemlock Creek, is also known as Pine River.
Another tributary, the Spaulding Creek, is also known as the Little Pine River
Another tributary, Quakenbush Drain, is also sometimes known as Pine River.

There are also at least seventeen streams known as Pine Creek in Michigan which may sometimes be referred to as Pine River, as well some other variants. Among them are:

 Pine Creek (Maple River tributary) rises south of Alma in Newark Township, Gratiot County, flows mostly south into Clinton County, emptying into the Maple River at  near Maple Rapids.

References 

Rivers of Michigan
Set index articles on rivers of Michigan